Gerson Marín (born 25 February 1989) is a former Mexican professional footballer who most recently played for Potros UAEM of Ascenso MX.

Honours
Oaxaca
Ascenso MX: Apertura 2017

References

External links

Living people
1989 births
Mexican footballers
Unión de Curtidores footballers
Alebrijes de Oaxaca players
Club Atlético Zacatepec players
Potros UAEM footballers
Liga MX players
Ascenso MX players
Liga Premier de México players
Tercera División de México players
Association football goalkeepers
People from San Luis Potosí City